Ó hEodhasa was the name of an Irish brehon family based in what is now County Fermanagh. The surname is now generally rendered as Hussey.

See also

 Aengus Ó hEodhasa, poet, died 1480.
 Ciothruaidh Ó hEodhasa, poet, died 1518.
 Giolla Brighde Ó hEoghusa, poet, 1608-1614.
 Gemma Hussey, Fine Gael TD and Minister, 1977-1989. [She is only a Hussey by marriage]

References

 http://www.irishtimes.com/ancestor/surname/index.cfm?fuseaction=Go.&UserID=

Surnames
Irish families
Irish Brehon families
Surnames of Irish origin
Irish-language surnames
Families of Irish ancestry